Stonehenge, Avebury and Associated Sites is a UNESCO World Heritage Site (WHS) in Wiltshire, England. The sites were inscribed as co-listings in 1986. Some large and well known monuments within the WHS are listed below, but the area also has an exceptionally high density of small-scale archaeological sites, particularly from the prehistoric period. More than 700 individual archaeological features have been identified. There are 160 separate Scheduled Monuments, covering 415 items or features.

Stonehenge and associated monuments

The Stonehenge area of the WHS is in south Wiltshire. It covers an area of 26 square km and is centred on the prehistoric monument of Stonehenge. Ownership is shared between English Heritage, the National Trust, the Ministry of Defence, the RSPB, Wiltshire Council, and private individuals and farmers.

Monuments in the Stonehenge WHS
Stonehenge
Stonehenge Avenue
Stonehenge Cursus
The Lesser Cursus
Cursus Barrows
Durrington Walls
Woodhenge
Cuckoo Stone
Coneybury Henge (has been ploughed flat)
King Barrow Ridge
Winterbourne Stoke Barrows
Normanton Down Barrows, including Bush Barrow
Vespasian's Camp
Robin Hood's Ball (an associated monument just north of the WHS boundary)
West Amesbury Henge, also known as Bluestonehenge

Avebury and associated monuments

Monuments in the Avebury WHS
Avebury Henge
West Kennet Avenue
Beckhampton Avenue
West Kennet Long Barrow
The Sanctuary
Silbury Hill
Windmill Hill

Museum and archive collections
The main museums are the Alexander Keiler Museum at Avebury, Salisbury Museum, and Wiltshire Museum in Devizes.

Other museums with material from Stonehenge and Avebury include the British Museum, National Museum of Wales, Cambridge University Museum of Archaeology and Anthropology and the Ashmolean Museum. Other archives include the Historic England Archive in Swindon, the Wiltshire and Swindon History Centre in Chippenham, and the Bodleian Library at Oxford.

See also 
 Stonehenge Landscape – the land owned by the National Trust
 History of Wiltshire

References

External links
 UNESCO: Stonehenge, Avebury and Associated Sites
 Website of Stonehenge & Avebury World Heritage Site
 Alexander Keiller Museum website
 Salisbury Museum website
 Wiltshire Museum website

Archaeological sites in Wiltshire
Geography of Wiltshire
 
World Heritage Sites in England